Muriel Hine (18 January 1874 – 16 June 1949) was a prolific British novelist under her own name and as Mrs Sidney Coxon.

Biography

Born Muriel Florence Hine in Nottinghamshire, England at the beginning of 1874 to George Thomas Hine the architect, and Florence Deane nee Cooper. Muriel married in 1903 to Sidney Coxon. She died in Chelsea in June 1949.

Literary Work

She was a romantic novelist who wrote both under her own name and as Mrs Sidney Coxon after she married in July 1903. She also wrote as Nicholas Bevel. At least one of her novels was turned into a film, the silent film Fifth Avenue Models in 1925 starring Mary Philbin, Norman Kerry and Josef Swickard. Her novels included the fantasy genre and at least one with a feminist theme. Her books were translated into at least Swedish (translated by A. Björklund) and Finnish. Hine also published short stories in magazines.

Bibliography

 Half in Earnest, 1910
 April Panhasard, 1913
 The man with the Double Heart, 1914
 The best in life, 1918
 The Hidden Valley, 1919
 Autumn, 1921
 The flight, 1923
 Youth wins, 1924
 The breathless moment, 1925
 Torquil's success, 1925
 Autumn, 1927
 Earth, 1928
 The Ladder of Folly, 1928
 The reluctant impostor, 1928
 The individual, 1928
 The seven lovers, and other stories, 1928
 The Hurcotts, 1929
 Pilgrim's Ford, 1930
 Ten days' wonder, 1931
 Wild rye, 1932
 Jenny Rorke, 1933
 The Door Opens, 1935
 The spell of Siris, 1935
 A man's way, 1935
 A different woman, 1936
 Clear as the sun, 1938
 Family circle, 1939
 Man of the House, 1940
 Forbidden love, 1941
 The Second Wife, 1943
 Marriage by proxy, 1944
 The Island Forbidden to Man, 1946
 Liar's Progress, 1950

References

External links 

 

1874 births
1949 deaths
British women novelists
People from Nottinghamshire